In late September 2019 Stones Gambling Hall, located in Citrus Heights, near Sacramento, California, came to prominence due to a cheating scandal that became known as Postlegate. Mike Postle was publicly accused of cheating in poker games he participated in during livestream events hosted at Stones Gambling Hall. "Stones Live" livestream poker games utilized playing cards with embedded RFID sensors that scanned the playing cards and transmitted identifying information (the cards' suits and ranks) into the livestream's technical control room and to play-by-play announcers and color commentators; casino management and livestream supervisors also had access to real-time identifying information of otherwise unknown, facedown, cards. The initial public accusation of Postle's alleged cheating was made by poker color commentator, interviewer, and recreational player Veronica Brill, whose day job of analytic analysis for the medical industry was instrumental in her being emboldened to accuse Postle of cheating. Brill's allegations were reported by Scott Van Pelt on ESPN's SportsCenter during its October 3, 2019, broadcast. Initially, industry, local, and national media closely followed the evolving story, but interest waned after criminal charges were not brought by law enforcement, and as civil lawsuits were adjudicated, settled, or dismissed (see litigation).

Cheating allegations 

In July 2018, Postle went on a prolonged poker "heater" (a winning streak), winning around $250,000 in mainly low-stakes ($1–3 and $2–5) no-limit Texas hold 'em games held at Stones Gambling Hall. Postle's "heater" occurred mainly when he played in livestream games. A little more than a year after Postle's winning streak began, during a Stones Live livestream game in September 2019, Stones Gambling Hall's color commentator Veronica Brill believed her long-held suspicions—that Postle was cheating which she had voiced to Stones' poker and livestream tournament director, Justin Kuraitis, months before—had been confirmed when she again witnessed perplexing and unorthodox poker play, in a crucial situation, that resulted in minimizing Postle's monetary loss.

In response to a particular hand played by Postle, during a reoccurring Stones Live livestream hold 'em game, wherein his perpetual unorthodox pattern of play again occurred when his poker hand was considered very strong yet would be a losing hand, he again prevailed by mucking (throwing away) his cards instead of calling a bet, Brill stated: "It doesn't make sense. It's like he knows. It doesn't make sense. It's weird." One week later, Brill posted an 18-minute video showing Postle's most unusual and similar hands that were played opposite of accepted professional poker standards, yet in each poker hand of Brill's video Postle either prevailed as an outright winner or by saving money by mucking a losing but very strong poker hand that, according to professional poker players' game theory and conventional wisdom, should have been played. Brill also tweeted out her suspicions.

Many people from poker's professional community (players, announcers, bloggers, authors, card room and technical control management) who viewed and commented on archived video footage from Stones Live livestreams echoed Brill's concern that Postle must have had access to real-time information about his opponents' hole cards and hand strength. Numerous well- and lesser-known people from poker's game theory optimal (GTO) community stated that the hands Postle won, or that he saved money on by mucking in key and critical situations, occurred at rates so mathematically improbable they could only have been attained by cheating.

During July 2018 to September 2019, when Postle was allegedly cheating, he consistently picked the perfect spots to: bluff; call bets when his opponents were bluffing; make big folds (muck) with very strong hands and/or just call instead of raising when his opponents had him beat. In addition, archived video shows that Postle repeatedly stared down into his lap, where he mostly kept his cell phone (out of sight from other players), leading to the suspicion that he was receiving information about the other players' hole cards on his cell phone. At other times he was not looking at his lap and it is theorized that he must have been receiving electronic signals in the brim of his hat.  Prior to July 2018 and his "heater," Postle usually kept his cell phone on Stones Gambling Hall's poker table's railing, in plain view of his opponents (where other players kept their cell phones). During that timeframe, Postle's poker results ebbed and flowed between winning and losing money, and he was not considered to be an exceptional poker player.

Litigation 

On 9 October 2019, 24 poker players filed a class action $30 million lawsuit against Postle, Stones Gambling Hall and its poker and livestream manager Justin "JRK" Kuraitis. In June 2020, Federal Judge William B. Shubb dismissed the lawsuit against all three defendants citing a very old California law. The case against Postle was dismissed "with prejudice", precluding a case from being refiled against him.

Three months after the dismissal, 60 of the then 88 plaintiffs accepted a settlement with King's Casino LLC, which owns Stones Gambling Hall, and Kuraitis. Brill was among the remaining 28 plaintiffs who did not settle. Less than a month afterward, Postle filed a $330 million dollar defamation lawsuit against a dozen individuals, including poker celebrity Daniel Negreanu, three-time World Series of Poker-winner Phil Galfond, and ESPN.  Postle's attorneys later filed to remove themselves from that case.

On December 8, 2020, defendant Todd Witteles filed an "anti-SLAPP" motion to dismiss Postle's lawsuit declaring it "frivolous and a violation of Witteles' free-speech rights."

On May 13, 2021, the judge ruled against Postle and ordered him to pay $27,000 for Witteles' legal fees and court costs.

On January 13, 2021, Brill filed her own "anti-SLAPP" motion. On June 16, 2021, Judge Shama H. Mesiwala ruled in favor of Brill and awarded her $27,000. Postle did not appear at the anti-SLAPP hearings, therefore the order went into effect immediately.

On April 1, 2021, Postle filed a request with Sacramento County Superior Court to drop his defamation lawsuit.

In September 2021 Postle filed a motion to avoid involuntary bankruptcy.

On January 7, 2022, a confidential agreement was entered into Postle's bankruptcy records which closed the only remaining litigation stemming from Stone Gamblings Hall livestream poker cheating scandal. That turn of events effectively put an end to the official Postlegate saga.

References

External links 

"Reality Check: Mike Postle Isn’t the Only Player Cheating on Poker Live-Streams" 

Year of birth missing (living people)
Living people
American poker players
People from Wisconsin